Kijewo is a municipal neighbourhood of the city of Szczecin, Poland, situated on the right bank of the Oder River, east of the Szczecin Old Town and south-east of Szczecin-Dąbie. As of December 2019, it had a population of 3,515.

Before 1945, when Szczecin (Stettin) was a part of Germany, the German name of this suburb was Stettin-Kienwerder.

References

Kijewo